The Jenkintown School District is a public school district in Montgomery County, Pennsylvania. The school district serves the borough of Jenkintown, a suburb of about 4,500 people that is three miles from Philadelphia.

Schools
The district features one elementary (K-6), and one middle/high school (7-12), both connected by a "link" and all on the same street. The public school is one of the smallest in Pennsylvania but usually has good scores. Jenkintown is a very small district in between the Abington and Cheltenham school districts. The link between the schools contains the administrator offices, community room, cafeteria, and band room.

Color Day
Jenkintown School District has an annual event known as Color Day on the Friday before Memorial Day. From 8:00 A.M. to 11:30 A.M., students participate in a small parade and then compete in events including tug-o-war (high school only), grade level events, and track. Whichever team (Reds or Blues) gets the most points at the end of the day wins Color Day. Every student is assigned to either Red or Blue team when they first enroll and keep that designation throughout their time at the school. Each year, two seniors, two eighth-graders, and two sixth-graders from each team are appointed Color Leader for that day.

See also
List of school districts in Pennsylvania

References

External links

School districts in Montgomery County, Pennsylvania
School District